Rommel's Treasure (Italian: Il tesoro di Rommel) is a 1955 Italian-American drama film directed by Romolo Marcellini and starring Dawn Addams, Paul Hubschmid and Isa Miranda. In post-war Cairo a variety of different people seek a stash of valuables and secret documents left behind by Erwin Rommel during the North African Campaign.

Cast
 Dawn Addams as Sofia  
 Paul Hubschmid as von Brunner 
 Isa Miranda as Mrs. Fischer  
 Bruce Cabot as Welles  
 Andrea Checchi as Krikorian  
 Wolfgang Lukschy as Petersen  
 Fanfulla as Muezir  
 Taheyya Kariokka
 John Stacy
 Vittorio Massimo as Krikorian
 Cristina Pall
 Paolo Caccia Dominioni as himself

References

Bibliography 
 Parish, Robert. Film Actors Guide. Scarecrow Press, 1977.

External links 
 
 Rommel's Treasure at Variety Distribution

1955 drama films
Italian drama films
1955 films
1950s Italian-language films
CinemaScope films
English-language Italian films
Films directed by Romolo Marcellini
Films scored by Carlo Rustichelli
Films set in Cairo
Treasure hunt films
Underwater action films
American drama films
1950s American films
1950s Italian films